Barbados competed at the 2018 Commonwealth Games in the Gold Coast, Australia from April 4 to April 15, 2018. It was Barbados's 16th appearance at the Commonwealth Games.

Squash athlete Meagan Best was the country's flag bearer during the opening ceremony.

Competitors
The following is the list of number of competitors participating at the Games per sport/discipline.

Athletics

Barbados participated with 8 athletes (5 men and 3 women).

Men
Track & road events

Women
Track & road events

Badminton

Barbados participated with two athletes (two men)

Boxing

Barbados participated with a team of 2 athletes (1 man and 1 woman)

Cycling

Barbados participated with 1 athlete (1 woman).

Track
Points race

Scratch race

Netball

Barbados qualified a netball team by virtue of being ranked in the top 11 (excluding the host nation, Australia) of the INF World Rankings on July 1, 2017.

Roster

Shonette Azore
Latonia Blackman
Vanessa Bobb
Damisha Croney
Rieah Holder
Teresa Howell
Rhe-Ann Niles
Nikita Piggott
Tonisha Rock-Yaw
Shonte Seale
Sabreena Smith
Shonica Wharton

Pool A

Ninth place match

Shooting

Barbados participated with 8 athletes (7 men and 1 woman).

Men

Women

Open

Squash

Barbados participated with 3 athletes (1 man and 2 women).

Individual

Doubles

Swimming

Barbados participated with 1 athlete (1 man).

Men

Table tennis

Barbados participated with 4 athletes (4 men).

Singles

Doubles

Team

Triathlon

Barbados participated with 2 athletes (2 men).

Individual

Weightlifting

Barbados participated with two athletes (two men).

See also
Barbados at the 2018 Summer Youth Olympics

References

Nations at the 2018 Commonwealth Games
Barbados at the Commonwealth Games
2018 in Barbadian sport